Bryan Martín Rabello Mella (born 16 May 1994) is a Chilean professional footballer who plays for Brazilian club Grêmio Novorizontino as an attacking midfielder.

Club career

Colo-Colo
Rabello made his competitive first team debut for Colo-Colo against Lota Schwager on 7 October 2009, aged 15, as a 36th-minute substitute for Charles Aránguiz in a Copa Chile 1–0 away victory. In the next season, Rabello made his home debut in a Copa Chile game. Within the same season, he played again as a substitute in a 4–2 victory against Curicó Unido. On 22 August 2010, the coach of the club Diego Cagna announced that Rabello would make his first start in a league game against Unión Española. His Copa Sudamericana debut came on 25 August against Universitario de Sucre as a substitute in a 3–1 home victory at Estadio Monumental.

Because of the injury of the Colombian playmaker Macnelly Torres, Diego Cagna opted to start Rabello during the club's last games. His impressive performances made many clubs of Europe interested in him. On 5 December 2010, in the last game of the 2010 Chilean Primera División, Rabello scored his first goal for the Cacique in the 50th minute in a 4–2 home victory.

Sevilla
Rabello signed a contract with Sevilla in Spain confirmed by Míchel González, where he began playing on the reserve team, Sevilla Atlético. He scored in his first-team debut in a pre-season match against UD Roteña. Rabello made his official debut with the first-team on 3 December 2012 against Real Valladolid in La Liga as a first-half substitute, replacing Cicinho in the 27th minute.

Loans & Mexico
In the next two seasons, he was played in Deportivo La Coruña, Luzern, Leganés on loan from Sevilla, and in 2015 signed a year contract with Mexican Liga MX club Santos Laguna. He played in Mexico with UNAM and BUAP until the summer of 2019. In the summer of 2019, he signed a year contract with Chilean Primera División club C.D. Universidad de Concepción.

Atromitos
On 5 February 2020, he signed a contract until the summer of 2021 with Greek Super League 1 club Atromitos for an undisclosed fee.

Grêmio Novorizontino
In March 2023, Rabello joined Grêmio Novorizontino in the Brazilian Série B.

International career
Rabello has been capped at under-17, under-20 and senior levels for Chile. He participated with the under-17 squad in a tournament organized by Universidad Católica, in 2011. With the under-20 squad, he played an instrumental part in the 2013 South American Youth Championship, playing eight matches and scoring a goal from a free kick against Peru, in a 1–1 draw, being the goal which decided Chile's qualification to the 2013 FIFA U-20 World Cup.

Rabello has played two matches for the senior squad both in friendlies. His debut came as a substitute in a friendly against Peru on 21 April 2012. His second match came after his performances in the 2013 South American Youth Championship, starting the friendly against Egypt on 8 February 2013, being substituted at half-time.

Career statistics

Club

Honours

Club
Colo-Colo
Campeonato Nacional: 2009 Clausura

Sevilla
UEFA Europa League: 2014

Santos Laguna
Liga MX: Clausura 2018
Campeón de Campeones: 2015

References

External links

 
 Bryan Rabello at Football-Lineups
 
 

1994 births
Living people
People from Rancagua
Chilean footballers
Association football midfielders
Segunda División Profesional de Chile players
Colo-Colo B footballers
Chilean Primera División players
Colo-Colo footballers
Universidad de Concepción footballers
Unión Española footballers
La Liga players
Sevilla FC players
Segunda División players
Deportivo de La Coruña players
CD Leganés players
Segunda División B players
Sevilla Atlético players
Swiss Super League players
FC Luzern players
Liga MX players
Santos Laguna footballers
Club Universidad Nacional footballers
Lobos BUAP footballers
Super League Greece players
Atromitos F.C. players
Campeonato Brasileiro Série B players
Grêmio Novorizontino players
Chilean expatriate footballers
Chilean expatriate sportspeople in Spain
Chilean expatriate sportspeople in Switzerland
Chilean expatriate sportspeople in Mexico
Chilean expatriate sportspeople in Greece
Chilean expatriate sportspeople in Brazil
Expatriate footballers in Spain
Expatriate footballers in Switzerland
Expatriate footballers in Mexico
Expatriate footballers in Greece
Expatriate footballers in Brazil
Chile under-20 international footballers
Chile international footballers